Onychogomphus bwambae is a species of dragonfly in the family Gomphidae. It is endemic to Uganda.  Its natural habitats are subtropical or tropical moist lowland forests and rivers. It is threatened by habitat loss.

Sources
 Clausnitzer, V. 2005.  Onychogomphus bwambae.   2006 IUCN Red List of Threatened Species.   Downloaded on 10 August 2007.

Gomphidae
Insects of Uganda
Endemic fauna of Uganda
Taxonomy articles created by Polbot
Insects described in 1961